Liiv Sandbox, formerly Sandbox Gaming, is a South Korean esports organization owned by the multi-channel network . It has teams competing in League of Legends, Crazyracing Kartrider, and FIFA Online. Its League of Legends team competes in the LCK, the top-level league for the game in South Korea.

League of Legends

History 
Sandbox Network acquired the roster and LCK spot of Team BattleComics on 18 December 2018, shortly after the latter qualified for the league through the promotion tournament.

Current roster

Notes

References

External links 
 Sandbox Network – Esports

Esports teams based in South Korea
League of Legends Champions Korea teams